The European qualification for the 2012 Men's Olympic Volleyball Tournament was held from 13 August 2011 to 13 May 2012.

Pool standing procedure
 Match points
 Number of matches won
 Sets ratio
 Points ratio
 Result of the last match between the tied teams

Match won 3–0 or 3–1: 3 match points for the winner, 0 match points for the loser
Match won 3–2: 2 match points for the winner, 1 match point for the loser

Pre–elimination round
Dates: 13–14 August 2011
All times are local.
In case of a 1–1 tie, teams play a Golden Set to determine the winner.

|}

First leg

|}

Second leg

|}

Elimination round
Dates: 26 August – 4 September 2011
All times are local.
In case of a 1–1 tie, teams play a Golden Set to determine the winner.

|}

First leg

|}

Second leg

|}

Pre–qualification tournaments
The Qualification Tournament hosts Bulgaria and the four 2011 World Cup participants directly qualified for the Qualification Tournament.

Tournament 1
Venue:  Poprad Arena, Poprad, Slovakia
Dates: 22–26 November 2011
All times are Central European Time (UTC+01:00).

Preliminary round

Pool A

|}

|}

Pool B

|}

|}

Final round

Semifinals

|}

Final

|}

Final standing

Tournament 2
Venue:  Complexe Sportif Léo Lagrange, Tourcoing, France
Dates: 23–27 November 2011
All times are Central European Time (UTC+01:00).

Preliminary round

Pool A

|}

|}

Pool B

|}

|}

Final round

Semifinals

|}

Final

|}

Final standing

Tournament 3
Venue:  Gradski vrt Hall, Osijek, Croatia
Dates: 22–26 November 2011
All times are Central European Time (UTC+01:00).

Preliminary round

Pool A

|}

|}

Pool B

|}

|}

Final round

Semifinals

|}

Final

|}

Final standing

Second ranked teams
Russia and Poland qualified for the 2012 Summer Olympics via the 2011 World Cup and are replaced by the top two second ranked teams.

|}

Qualification tournament
Venue:  Armeets Arena, Sofia, Bulgaria
Dates: 8–13 May 2012
All times are Eastern European Summer Time (UTC+03:00).

Preliminary round

Pool A

|}

|}

Pool B

|}

|}

Final round

Semifinals

|}

Final

|}

Final standing
{| class="wikitable" style="text-align:center;"
|-
!width=40|Rank
!width=180|Team
|- bgcolor=#ccffcc
|1
|style="text-align:left;"|
|-
|2
|style="text-align:left;"|
|-
|rowspan=2|3
|style="text-align:left;"|
|-
|style="text-align:left;"|
|-
|rowspan=2|5
|style="text-align:left;"|
|-
|style="text-align:left;"|
|-
|rowspan=2|7
|style="text-align:left;"|
|-
|style="text-align:left;"|
|}

External links
Official website

Olympic Qualification Men Europe
Olympic Qualification Men Europe
Volleyball qualification for the 2012 Summer Olympics